Conrad Anthony Francis (born 8 August 1981) is a Sri Lankan former swimmer, who specialized in butterfly events. He is a two-time Olympian (2000 and 2004), a three-time swimmer at the Commonwealth Games (2002, 2006, 2010), and a double gold medalist in the 50 and 100 m butterfly at the Asian Age Group Championships. Francis also became the first Sri Lankan to swim the same stroke under 56 seconds, when he competed at the 2004 FINA World Short Course Championships in Indianapolis, Indiana.

Francis made his first Sri Lankan team at the 2000 Summer Olympics in Sydney, where he competed in the men's 100 m butterfly. Swimming in heat one, he picked up a fifth seed and fifty-eighth overall by 0.81 of a second behind Latvia's Artūrs Jakovļevs in 57.44.

At the 2004 Summer Olympics in Athens, Francis qualified again for the 100 m butterfly, by receiving a Universality place from FINA, in an invitation time of 56.36. He challenged seven other swimmers on the second heat, including fellow two-time Olympians Daniel O'Keeffe and Nicholas Rees of the Bahamas. He raced again to fifth place by a 1.93-second margin behind winner Michal Rubáček of the Czech Republic in 56.80. Francis failed to advance into the semifinals, as he placed fifty-second overall in the preliminaries.

Francis previously resided in Melbourne, Australia, where he graduated with a bachelor's degree in sports development, management, and recreation at Swinburne University of Technology. He also competed for Nunawading Swim Club under head coach Leigh Nugent, who led his Australian swimming team at two Olympic Games before his resignation in 2013.

Francis now coaches students at the Seoul Foreign School known as SFS.

References

External links
 
Alumni Profile – Swinburne University of Technology

1981 births
Living people
Sri Lankan male swimmers
Olympic swimmers of Sri Lanka
Swimmers at the 2000 Summer Olympics
Swimmers at the 2004 Summer Olympics
Commonwealth Games competitors for Sri Lanka
Swimmers at the 2002 Commonwealth Games
Swimmers at the 2006 Commonwealth Games
Swimmers at the 2010 Commonwealth Games
Male butterfly swimmers
Swimmers from Colombo
Swinburne University of Technology alumni
Australian people of Sri Lankan descent
South Asian Games gold medalists for Sri Lanka
South Asian Games silver medalists for Sri Lanka
South Asian Games medalists in swimming